Robert Graham  (3 December 1786 – 7 August 1845) was a Scottish physician and botanist.

Life

Graham was born in Stirling the son of Dr Robert Graham, physician. After studying at Stirling Grammar School he continued first to the University of Glasgow and then to the University of Edinburgh where he graduated around 1806, and completed his MD in 1808. He trained further at St Bartholomew's Hospital, London, where he qualified as a surgeon. He then returned to Scotland to practice at Glasgow Royal Infirmary 1812-3 and 1816–19.

In 1816 he began lecturing in botany at the University of Glasgow, taking over from Thomas Brown of Lanfine and Waterhaughs following his resignation. He was a major figure in the creation of Glasgow Botanic Gardens, and was the inaugural Chair of Botany at the Glasgow in 1818. In 1820 he moved to Edinburgh to take up the position of Professor of Botany and Medicine at the University of Edinburgh, a role he continued until 1845. He was also physician to the Royal Infirmary of Edinburgh, and the 6th Regius Keeper of the Royal Botanic Garden Edinburgh (1820–1845).

In 1820 he was elected a member of the Aesculapian Club. In 1821 Graham was elected a Fellow of the Royal Society of Edinburgh, his proposer being Thomas Charles Hope.

In the 1830s he is listed as living at 62 Great King Street in Edinburgh's New Town.

From 1840 to 1842 he served as President of the Royal College of Physicians of Edinburgh.

He died at Coldoch in Perthshire on 7 August 1845.

Memberships and positions held
Member of the Highland Society, 1821–45
Fellow of the Royal Society of Edinburgh, 1821–1845
President of the Royal College of Physicians, Edinburgh, 1840–42
First President of the Botanical Society of Edinburgh, 1836
President of the Medico-Chirugical Society, 1842

Botanical contributions
He wrote descriptions of new and rare plants cultivated in the gardens which were published in Edinburgh New Philosophical Magazine, Curtis's Botanical Magazine and Hooker's Companion to the Botanical Magazine.

Among plants he described was the Australian shrub Lasiopetalum macrophyllum.

In fiction

Robert Graham features as a character in Sara Sheridan's novel The Fair Botanists (2021).

References

Further reading
Robert Graham Penny Cyclopaedia of the Society for the Diffusion of Useful Knowledge, 1851
1670 and all that: a brief chronology Royal Botanic Garden Edinburgh

External links

1786 births
1845 deaths
19th-century Scottish people
People from Stirling
Alumni of the University of Glasgow
Alumni of the University of Edinburgh
Academics of the University of Glasgow
Academics of the University of Edinburgh
Fellows of the Royal College of Physicians of Edinburgh
Presidents of the Royal Society of Edinburgh
Botanists with author abbreviations
19th-century Scottish medical doctors
Scottish botanists

ca:Robert Graham